Nathaniel C. Wyeth (October 24, 1911 – July 4, 1990) was an American mechanical engineer and inventor. He is best known for creating a variant of polyethylene terephthalate that could withstand the pressure of carbonated liquids. Made of recyclable PET plastic, lighter than glass and virtually unbreakable, Wyeth's invention is used widely today for both carbonated and non-carbonated drinks.

Early life
Born in Asgard near Chadds Ford, he displayed an engineering talent throughout his youth. Wyeth held a bachelor's degree in mechanical engineering from the University of Pennsylvania. Wyeth is also known as the brother of painters Andrew Wyeth, Carolyn Wyeth, and Henriette Wyeth Hurd, the father of musician Howard Wyeth, and as the son of artist and illustrator N. C. Wyeth.

Wyeth often called himself "the other Wyeth" because N.C. and Andrew Wyeth were so well known.

Career
Nathaniel Wyeth joined DuPont in 1936 as a field engineer. By 1963 he was the company's first engineering fellow and when he retired in 1976, was DuPont's first senior engineering fellow, the company's highest technical position.

In 1967, he pondered whether soda could be stored in plastic bottles. After experimenting with a plastic detergent bottle that proved incapable of withstanding the forces of pressurized liquids, he realized that a much stronger material would be required. He initially experimented with polypropylene, but ultimately settled on polyethylene terephthalate as the material and received the patent in 1973.

Wyeth received the 1981 Society of Plastics Engineers international award for outstanding achievement, and was inducted into the Society of the Plastics Industry Hall of Fame in 1986. He was a fellow of the American Society of Mechanical Engineers.

Wyeth was the first person ever named senior engineering fellow at DuPont, the company's highest technical position. Nathaniel invented or co-invented twenty-five products.  In 1990, Wyeth was award DuPont's Lavoisier Award for Technical Achievement.

Wyeth's other innovations included improvements to manufacturing process, plastics, textiles, electronics and mechanical devices.

Personal life 
He married Caroline Pyle (Howard Pyle's niece) in 1937. Local residents were inclined to think Caroline and Wyeth's father, N. C. Wyeth, carried on a relationship, though biographer David Michaelis found little evidence to suggest it. Caroline died in 1973 and in 1984 Wyeth married Jean Grady.

Wyeth and Caroline had six sons: Newell, Howard, N. Convers III, Andrew, John, and David, and one daughter, Melinda, who died very young. Newell, their oldest, died tragically in 1945 alongside his famous grandfather, N.C. Wyeth (Wyeth's father), when their car stalled on a railroad crossing near their home and they were struck by a milk train.

See also

 Wyeth

Notes

References
 MIT Inventor of the Week, Aug. 1998

External links
 Nathaniel C. Wyeth at the "Plastics Academy Hall of Fame".
 Nathaniel C. Wyeth at the "Polymer Processing Hall of Fame".

American inventors
American mechanical engineers
University of Pennsylvania School of Engineering and Applied Science alumni
Wyeth family
1911 births
1990 deaths
People from Chadds Ford Township, Pennsylvania